Austin and Stone's Dime Museum (ca.1880s-1900s) of Boston, Massachusetts, was an entertainment emporium in Scollay Square (no.4 Tremont Row), established by William Austin and Frank Stone. It featured a freak show as well as dancing girls for entertainment. The freak show and other exhibits such as two-headed animals cost ten cents, while admission to the girlie show cost an additional dime. Performers included William S. Hutchings, the "lightning calculator." Comedian Fred Allen wrote about the Museum in his memoir, Much Ado About Me.

References

Images

External links

 Fred Allen's Memoirs of Scollay Square
 Bostonian Society. Photograph of 3-7 Tremont Row, ca. 1908-1912

Government Center, Boston
Former theatres in Boston
19th century in Boston